Penicillium loliense is an anamorph species of the genus of Penicillium.

References

loliense
Fungi described in 1980